Club Social y Deportivo Loma Negra (usually known as Loma Negra) is an Argentine sports club based in Olavarría, Buenos Aires Province. The team currently plays in the Liga de Fútbol de Olavarría. The club was established and owned by the homonymous cement company in 1929.

The club played at the highest level of Argentine football (Primera División) on two occasions, having qualified to play the Nacional championships of 1981 and 1983. In 1981 Loma Negra was eliminated in the first round although the team had achieved a 1–0 win over Ferro Carril Oeste and two 0–0 ties with the favorite River Plate.>

In 1982 Loma Negra played a friendly match against the touring team of the Soviet Union, who had played out a draw against Argentina in that same tour. Loma Negra defeated the URSS 1–0 in what has to go down as one of biggest upsets ever.

In 1983 the club progressed to the last sixteen stage of the competition and their striker Armando Husillos was the tournament top scorer with 11 goals.

The club have had little success since their heyday in the early 1980s and now plays at amateur level.

Titles 
 Liga de Fútbol de Olavarría (9): 1949, 1966, 1975, 1978, 1980, 1982, 1984, 1991

Notable players 
  Félix Orte
  Armando Husillos
  Osvaldo Rinaldi 
  Pedro Magallanes

Notable managers 
  Rogelio Domínguez
  Roberto Saporiti

References

External links 

 

Association football clubs established in 1929
Football clubs in Buenos Aires Province
1929 establishments in Argentina